The Military ranks of Malawi are the military insignia used by the Malawian Defence Force. Being a former British protectorate, Malawi shares a rank structure similar to that of the United Kingdom.

Commissioned officer ranks
The rank insignia of commissioned officers.

Other ranks
The rank insignia of non-commissioned officers and enlisted personnel.

References

External links
 

Malawi and the Commonwealth of Nations
Malawi
Military of Malawi